István Halász (born 27 August 1965) is a Hungarian weightlifter. He competed in the men's middle heavyweight event at the 1992 Summer Olympics.

References

External links
 

1965 births
Living people
Hungarian male weightlifters
Olympic weightlifters of Hungary
Weightlifters at the 1992 Summer Olympics
Sportspeople from Jász-Nagykun-Szolnok County
20th-century Hungarian people